Viroqua ultima is a species of spider in the family Salticidae (jumping spiders). It is the only described species of the genus Viroqua. It is only found in Australia. The species was first described by Ludwig Carl Christian Koch in 1881, in the genus Jotus, and was transferred to the new genus Viroqua by George and Elizabeth Peckham in 1901. It is likely that the Peckhams derived the genus name from Viroqua, Wisconsin, as they named genera after unrelated locations on several other occasions.

References

Salticidae
Spiders described in 1881
Spiders of Australia